FutureQuake was a British small press comic book founded by Arthur Wyatt, and later edited by Richmond Clements, David Evans and Owen Watts. Dedicated to showcasing work by new writers and artists, they published mostly self-contained comic stories, generally of 5 pages or less and usually of a sci-fi/fantasy/horror bent.

Under their FutureQuake Press imprint (FQP) they also published the Japanese Manga-influenced anthology MangaQuake and the horror comic Something Wicked. FQP also published other comics, and took over Dogbreath, the Strontium Dog fanzine and Zarjaz, the general 2000 AD fanzine.

39 issues of FutureQuake were published until publication went on hiatus following the death of David Evans in May 2021.

Contributors
FutureQuake played host to a wide range of contributors, including first time writers and artists, up-and-coming small press personalities and established creators. Issues featured the likes of Alan Grant, Arthur Ranson, Al Ewing, Stewart McKenny, PJ Holden, Arthur Wyatt, Inaki Miranda & Eva de la Cruz, Adrian Bamforth, Matt Timson, Michael Molcher, Paul Scott and Charlie Adlard.

Staff

The staff in 2021 were:

Dave Evans: Art/Commissioning Editor
Richmond Clements: Script Editor
Owen Watts: Editor
Barny Shergold: Webmaster

Previous members:

Arthur Wyatt (founder and sole editor for issues 1–3)
James Mackay (script editor)
Edward Berridge (script editor)

FutureQuake Press output

Though FutureQuake was ostensibly open to any form of submission from anyone who chose to do so, there were certain forms and themes to which the comic adheres. As an anthology, the stories often featured a moralistic 'twist' at the end, much in the same style as EC Comics's science fiction and horror comics like Weird Science and The Vault of Horror, as well as 2000 AD's Future Shocks. However, the stories were not necessarily bound by this.

Issues

 1. Features work by Arthur Wyatt, Matt Timson, Michael Molcher and Adrian Bamforth among others. With a cover by PJ Holden (free to download).
 2. Features work by Arthur Wyatt, Michael Molcher and Matt Timson among others. With a cover by PJ Holden (free to download).
 3. Features work by Arthur Wyatt, David Evans and Adrian Bamforth among others. With a cover by PJ Holden (free to download).
 4. Features work by Arthur Ranson, Inaki Miranda & Eva de la Cruz, Mark Woodland, Stewart McKenny, Cullen Bunn (whose first published comics work appears in this issue) and Richmond Clements among others. With a foreword by Alan Grant and a cover by Matt Timson (free to download).
 5. Features work by Al Ewing, Michael Molcher, Arthur Wyatt, Julia Bax and Edward Berridge among others. With a foreword by Harry Harrison and a cover by Charlie Adlard.
 6. Features work by Stewart McKenny (cover), Boo Cook, Arthur Wyatt.
 7. Features work by Al Ewing, Paul Scott and Matt Timson (cover)
 21. Features work by Dave Thomson and Gary Robinson amongst others. With a cover by Gibson Quarter
 23. Features work by Ollie Masters and Dan Cornwell amongst others. With a cover by Kev Levell

Reviews

With 48 pages, this issue boasts nine multi-page and five one-page strips and art contributions from industry professionals Arthur Ranson, Stewart McKenny, Inaki Miranda and Eva de la Cruz, as well as published authors and other overseas contributors. There are some striking strips concerning the fate of alien abductees, how unfunded superheroes support themselves, the burden of bureaucracy  on crime fighters, and a breakthrough in temporal research. – Comics International, about FQ #4
ZINE OF THE MONTH.  Don't be fooled by its relatively simplistic cover – Futurequake is an excellent 'zine with a great selection of standalone strips, ranging from the darkly dramatic ("Domestic Bliss") to traditional sci-fi themes with a comedy twist ("Fortunate Son").  There's real talent [in] both the writing and the art – check out the single-pager "Wrecks" for an example of a short but superbly-told story – and brilliant SF ideas abound. – SFX, March 2006, about FQ #5
It will run for quite a while and go from strength to strength – Comics International 192
Futurequake #6  (£A4, £3.50), inspired no doubt in part by Tharg's Future Shocks but owing more, I think to SF short fiction and US pulp comics, is a delight. Well deserving its status of SFX Fanzine of the Month – Down the Tubes
The cover and opening strip, Triumph of the Will, by Ed Berridge, Richmond Clements and fine artistic talent Andy Finlayson, make this a must for WWII superhero completists. Gray Wilkinson and Bolt-01 collaborate on a destiny-charged tale with an ironic twist; Arthur Wyatt and Peter Anckom do a nice line in military subterfuge; while several other strips deliver twists so oblique it that their meaning isn't immediately apparent – Comics International, about FQ #6

Awards

Fanzine of the Month in SFX for FutureQuake #5

MangaQuake

MangaQuake moves away from the FutureQuake format, opting instead for longer stories less reliant on the narrative structure of the 'twist', clearly influenced by the Japanese manga comics form.

Issues
1. Features work by Michiru Morikawa, Joanna Zhou, Mongoose McCloud and Edward Berridge among others. With a foreword by Jonathan Clements and a cover by Michiru Morikawa. (free to download)
2. Features work by PJ Holden, Ed Berridge, Sonia Leong and Bryan Coyle. Issue #2 was withdrawn and reissued with a different cover due to copyright problems with the initial cover.
3. Features work by PJ Holden, Bryan Coyle and Mongoose McCloud.

Reviews

A stylistic departure for small press sci-fi comics – Comics International 192
This very pretty stripzine boasts a broad selection of different art styles, although despite the name, only a few strips make use of the Japanese aesthetic. The highpoints are "Cyborg Butterfly" – reminiscent of Yukito Kishiro's Battle Angel Alita – and the somewhat more Westernised "Wildcards", which parodies Power Rangers and Godzilla and the super robot genre and is very funny with it, too! – SFX, about MangaQuake #2
Cyborg Butterfly by Sonia Leong, features beautiful art, but substitutes sentiment for characterisation. Mongoose McCloud's Wildcard Taskforce Robo-Guardians, on the other hand, goes all out for fun, with cheeky Jack of Clubs slipping in some filthy remarks about his team-mates. The five shorter strips are all charming in their own way, with The Stunt, and Squandered Eden telling complete stories with admirable economy – Comics International, about MangaQuake #2

Awards

Fanzine of the Month in SFX for MangaQuake #2

Something Wicked

Something Wicked was the third title launched. The horror comic directly parallels and references the horror titles published by EC Comics and those published by Atlas during the 1950s.

Issues

There have been ten issues so far.

1. Features contains16 strips from creators including Adrian Bamforth. Ed Berridge and Keith Burns' tale By The Pricking of My Thumbs also appeared as the first strip in the small press slot of the Judge Dredd Megazine.
10. Current Issue. Features contains 10 strips from various creators.  Cover by Jon Taylor.

Reviews

All the strips are beautifully drawn, but not all have an inevitability or necessary logic to them. Hence the most satisfactory story is Adrian Bamforth's The Other Side, which delivers an unexpected twist that doesn't make the reader wonder why it happened – Comics International
the execution is superb and, with each strip taking just the right amount of time to deliver its impact, and they're all nicely tied together too – SFX Magazine

Awards

Fanzine of the Month in SFX.

Others

They have published or agreed to take over publishing a number of titles all of which are not part of the core FQP titles (above). As well as their personal projects, these include:	

Dogbreath is a Strontium Dog fanzine that, after 14 issues, needed a new home.
Stak! is a one-off Rogue Trooper fanzine published in Autumn 2007 to coincide with 2000 AD'''s 30th anniversary.Zarjaz also needed a new home, four issues after the relaunch.

Other press coverage
Magazine articles:Judge Dredd Megazine #240 (February 2006) contains a five-page article by Matthew Badham on the British small press comics scene, including interviews with many creators (such as Al Ewing & Arthur Wyatt), and reviews of titles including FutureQuake. Stewart McKenny's cover for FutureQuake #6 forms the article's frontispiece.Judge Dredd Megazine #251 contained a full page feature on FQP, Shocking Futures and Twisted Tales, by Matthew Badham. It concluded "With a committed editorial team, FutureQuake looks to be a major player in the small press scene for some time to come."

Awards
2007: Nominated for the "Favourite Black & White Comicbook" Eagle Award
2008: Nominated for the "Favourite Black and White Comicbook" Eagle Award
2010: Nominated for the "Favourite Black and White Comicbook" Eagle Award
2011: Nominated for the "Favourite British Comicbook: Black and White" Eagle Award (as were FutureQuake Publishing's 2000 AD fanzines Zarjaz and Dogbreath)
2012: Nominated for the "Favourite British Comicbook: Black and White" Eagle Award (as was FutureQuake Publishing's 2000 AD fanzines Zarjaz'')

See also
Hi-Ex, Inverness-based comic convention organised by Richmond Clements

References

External links
FutureQuake homepage  
Dave Evans interview
Dave Evans's profile at 2000 AD
Richmond Clements' profile at 2000 AD
Review of FQ #4

British comics titles
British small press comics